Tamara Taylor (born September 27, 1970) is a Canadian actress. She appeared in the role of Dr. Camille Saroyan, head of the Forensic Division, in the forensic crime drama Bones. She also appeared in season seven of Marvel's Agents of S.H.I.E.L.D., in which she played Sibyl, one of the two main antagonists. She also starred in the first two seasons of Law & Order: Organized Crime.

Early life and career 
Taylor was born in Toronto to a Bajan father and a Scottish mother. She dropped out of high school to try modeling and see the world, with her mother supportive of her decision: "School will always be there, she told me."

She has appeared in the CBS medical drama 3 lbs as Della and the UPN series Sex, Love & Secrets in the role of Nina; both series were short-lived.

Taylor has made guest appearances on NCIS, Numb3rs, Lost, CSI: Miami, Without a Trace, Party of Five and Dawson's Creek. In her feature film debut, Senseless, she played Marlon Wayans's love interest. She portrayed Debrah Simmons in the 2005 romantic-comedy Diary of a Mad Black Woman, Halle Berry's best friend in Introducing Dorothy Dandridge, and had a brief role in Serenity, the movie conclusion of the TV series Firefly by Joss Whedon. Through her part in Serenity, Taylor was able to audition for a show with actor David Boreanaz, who had previously worked with Whedon in Buffy the Vampire Slayer and Angel. She also appeared in the TV series Lost, as the former girlfriend of Michael and mother of Walt.

She first appeared in Bones in the first episode of the second season, "The Titan on the Tracks",  portraying the character Dr. Camille Saroyan. In the first six episodes of the season, she was credited as a guest star because creator and writer Hart Hanson had planned to kill her off in episode 12 when Howard Epps, a recurring serial killer, poisoned her, to create more tension and drama between the two main characters, but the response to her character was so strong that the writers offered her a position as a recurring regular in the show. Thus, from the following episode, "The Girl with the Curl", she was credited as a main character for the remainder of the series.

Tamara Taylor later recurred on the final season of Agents of S.H.I.E.L.D. portraying the Chronicom Sibyl, who was the season's secondary antagonist.

In October 2022 it was announced that Taylor would join the final series of the FX series Snowfall in an as-yet unannounced role.

Personal life 

Taylor is a second cousin by marriage to Neve Campbell, with whom she appeared on Party of Five. Taylor married attorney Miles Cooley in 2007 but the couple divorced in May 2012.

Filmography

Film 2023 Snowfall

Television

References

External links 
 

1970 births
Actresses from Toronto
Black Canadian actresses
Canadian film actresses
Canadian people of Barbadian descent
Canadian people of Scottish descent
Canadian television actresses
Living people
20th-century Canadian actresses
21st-century Canadian actresses